INTERPRINT is one of the world´s leading decor printers. Interprint decorate the surfaces of numerous materials in the segment of derived timber products, including living room, kitchen and bathroom furniture, laminate flooring and for interior furnishing in trains, ships or in the recreational vehicle industry.

About INTERPRINT 
Interprint produces with 30 production presses with a total capacity of 2.1 billion square metres at 9 production sites in Germany, the United States, Poland, Malaysia, China, Russia, Brazil and Spain and has approximately 1,500 employees worldwide. It is headquartered in Arnsberg, North Rhine-Westfalia / Germany.

Interprint is part of the Toppan Group. The Wrede Industrieholding announced the end of 2018 to sell the company. On November 01, 2019, Interprint was fully taken over by the Japanese company Toppan Printing Co., Ltd.

Locations 
Production and Sales Offices: 

 Germany - Arnsberg
 Brazil - Curitiba
 China - Changzhou, Shanghai
 Indien - Mumbai
 Italy - Affi
 Malaysia - Nilai
 Poland - Ozorków
 Russia - Egorievsk, Moscow, Samara
 Spain - Tordera, Madrid
 South Africa - Pretoria
 Turkey - Istanbul
 USA - Pittsfield

Interprint is also represented by agencies around the world.

Products 
Wood, stone and creative decors from Interprint decorate the surfaces of furniture and flooring and derived timber products used for interior design. In these areas, Interprint offers their customers a large range of materials for their processing. These include decorative paper, finish foils, melamine films, water-resistant films and other product innovations – produced with gravure printing or industrial digital printing.

After all, the finish determines the look of a piece of furniture and is thus an important aspect of the purchasing decision.

History 
The history of Interprint:

 2019: Interprint has become part of the Toppan company.
 2015: Interprint enters new worlds in decor printing with the first industrial digital printing machine worldwide.
 2014: Interprint expands its international team by building a new production plant in Curitiba, Brazil, and a sales office in Pretoria, South Africa.
 2010: Interprint becomes active in Spain and Turkey, with new sales offices opening in Madrid and Istanbul respectively. Interprint also acquires all shares in OOO Coveright RUS in Samara/Russia. The new location for the production of melamine films will in future do business under the name 'OOO Interprint Samara'.
 2008: In the midst of this global crisis, Interprint invests in a new production plant in Egorievsk, Russia.
 2006: Interprint celebrates the opening of its engraving and design centre in Arnsberg, Germany, and a new production plant in Pittsfield, Massachusetts, USA.
 2003: It's the beginning of an era for Interprint as it opens a production plant in Changzhou, China.
 2001: Interprint opens a sales office in Shanghai, China.
 1998: Interprint sets new standards in the Eastern European markets thanks to its new production plant in Poland.
 1997: Interprint navigates its way over the Alps to Italy, where it opens its sales office Interprint Italia S.r.l.
 1995: Interprint goes beyond its continental frontiers for the second time, opening a new production plant in Malaysia to cater for the Asian region.
 1990: Interprint has opened a sales office in Moscow, Russia.
 1983: Interprint establishes its first subsidiary in the USA. Interprint, Inc. is now the number one for decor printing in North America.
 1969: Interprint was founded by Paul Wrede.

External links 
 INTERPRINT Homepage
 TOPPAN PRINTING Co., LTD.

Notes

Printing companies of Germany
Companies based in North Rhine-Westphalia
Arnsberg
Design companies established in 1969
1969 establishments in West Germany
German companies established in 1969